The canton of Antibes-Biot is a former administrative division in Alpes-Maritimes, southeastern France. It was created on 31 January 1985. Its seat was in Antibes. It was disbanded following the French canton reorganisation which came into effect in March 2015. It had 38,899 inhabitants (2012). It included the following communes:
Antibes (partly)
Biot.

Demographics

See also
Cantons of the Alpes-Maritimes department

References

Former cantons of Alpes-Maritimes
Canton Antibes Biot
1985 establishments in France
2015 disestablishments in France
States and territories established in 1985
States and territories disestablished in 2015